The British International School Hanoi, commonly referred to as BIS Hanoi, is an international school in the Vinhomes Riverside neighborhood of Hanoi, Vietnam. It is also part of the Nord Anglia Education group and is one of four British International schools in Vietnam. The school provides a British-style education for children aged two to eighteen. The student-to-teacher ratio is approximately 20:1. It is a registered center for the UK Cambridge Assessment International Education examination board.

Curriculum
The Early Years Foundation Stage and primary school curriculum are based on the National Curriculum for England and the International Primary Curriculum. The secondary school follows the National Curriculum taught to students in England, Wales, and Northern Ireland.  Students prepare for the International General Certificate of Secondary Education during their 10th and 11th years. Despite this, years 12 and 13, curriculum switch to the IB Diploma Programme.

The school is an IB World School, authorized to deliver the IB Diploma Programme. It is a member of the Federation of British International Schools in Asia and is accredited by the Council of International Schools and the Western Association of Schools and Colleges.

The school offers The Duke of Edinburgh's Award and  also holds an annual international festival.

One of the most notable alumni is Yewon (Sally) Kim. She has won the honorary Principal's Award for Term II of the 2020-21 school year and is now studying overseas.

References

Cambridge schools in Vietnam
British international schools in Vietnam
Nord Anglia Education
High schools in Hanoi